Issogne (Issime ) is a town and comune in the Aosta Valley region of north-western Italy. It has 1422 residents and it is known for Issogne Castle and wineries. About a 70% of the local wines are produced from the red Nebbiolo grape, which is native to the neighboring Piedmont region.

References

Cities and towns in Aosta Valley